Kristian Caleb Cox (born 28 September 1992) is an English football striker who has played for Port Vale, Ilkeston, New Mills, Hyde, and Gresley.

Career
Cox started his career in the youth ranks at Port Vale. He was handed the number 23 shirt for the 2010–11 season, making his debut in a 2–1 defeat at Crewe Alexandra on 15 January 2011 under new manager Jim Gannon. Three months later caretaker-manager Mark Grew announced that Cox would not be offered a contract at the club for the following season. He then spent a brief spell with Northern Premier League Division One South club Ilkeston, and scored in the new club's first competitive match in a 4–0 victory over Goole. However he played just three more times before he left the club in September 2011 in order to look for a club that offered full-time training. He played for New Mills of the Northern Premier League Division One North in 2012. He signed with Northern Premier League Division One South side Gresley in February 2013 after a spell with Hyde reserves, and made six appearances before leaving in June of that year.

Career statistics

References

1992 births
Living people
Footballers from Birmingham, West Midlands
English footballers
Association football forwards
Black British sportspeople
Port Vale F.C. players
Ilkeston F.C. players
New Mills A.F.C. players
Hyde United F.C. players
Gresley F.C. players
English Football League players
Northern Premier League players